"Manger Things" is the 16th episode of the thirty-second season of the American animated television series "The Simpsons", and the 700th episode in all. It aired in the United States on Fox on March 21, 2021. The episode was directed by Steven Dean Moore and written by Rob LaZebnik.

The couch gag is animated by Bill Plympton, his seventh episode for The Simpsons.

Plot

While decorating a Christmas Tree in 2021, Bart discovers an ornament reading, "Todd's First Christmas", and asks Marge the story behind the decoration. 

Back in 2014, Homer and Marge arrive at the meeting at the Springfield Nuclear Power Plant. Although Homer promises not to drink, Lenny and Carl spike his soda, making him drunk enough to mock Mr. Burns. Marge, seemingly appalled by Homer's behavior, refuses to let him inside the house for Christmas, leaving him to wander town until Ned Flanders lets him join his family, despite his pregnant wife, Maude's, obvious displeasure. Homer eats the Christmas ham, begins having hallucinations of Hell from a painting, ruins Grace, and teaches Rod to swear, prompting Maude to kick him out of their house. Homer goes to Moe's Tavern, where Moe shows him a secret room above the garage.

On Christmas Eve, Bart and Lisa offer to give up all their toys for Christmas in exchange for Homer coming home. Marge agrees on the condition that he does one selfless deed. Overhearing this, Homer tries baking Christmas cookies, only to burn the kitchen. Suddenly, Maude goes into labor, while Ned is out delivering Christmas turkeys to the poor. Homer rushes to assist Maude with the birth while unaware that Marge is watching. Marge and Homer reconcile, while Maude and Ned decide to name the baby Todd Homer.

In the tag, Bart scares Rod and Todd with Grampa's missing dentures, which he searches for as Homer and Marge make out in the secret room with Moe surreptitiously watching. The credits feature Christmas cards from various Springfield residents.

Reception

Viewing figures 
In the United States, the episode was watched live by 1.28 million viewers.

Critical response 
The episode aired on March 21, 2021 on Fox in United States. In his five star review, Tony Sokol from Den of Geek wrote that "'Manger Things' works exceedingly well as a stocking stuffer, even if it does arrive on the first day of spring." The A.V. Club was more critical, giving the episode a "C-minus" rating.

References

The Simpsons (season 32) episodes
2021 American television episodes
American Christmas television episodes
Pregnancy-themed television episodes